Dr. Mahendra Singh is a leader of Bhartiya Janta Party and MLC in Uttar Pradesh since 2012. He is a former professor from a college. He is national secretary of BJP and prabhari of Assam BJP. He is credited with the huge success of BJP in Assam Legislative Assembly election in 2016. He was Cabinet Minister of Ministry of Jal Shakti of the Government of Uttar Pradesh. Before 22 August 2019 he was Minister of State (Independent Charge) of Gramya Vikas, Samagra Gramya Vikas and MOS of health departments but after winning 12 continuous rewards from Government of India in different departments including Pradhan Mantri Awas Yojana & Online Transparent Transfer Mechanism for Gram Vikas Department Employee (Developed In-house by UPSRLM, Dept. of Gram Vikas), he was promoted to Cabinet Minister. Dr. Singh also started online transparent Posting for newly joined AE's in Irrigation and Minor Irrigation Department.

Early life
Mahendra Singh was born to Late Ramdas Singh in a peasant family in Pratapgarh, Uttar Pradesh. His brother's name is Aditya Gupta.  He has a son & a daughter.

References

Members of the Uttar Pradesh Legislative Council
Bharatiya Janata Party politicians from Uttar Pradesh
State cabinet ministers of Uttar Pradesh
Yogi ministry
Samajwadi Party politicians
Indian prisoners and detainees
Living people
People from Sitapur district
Crime in Goa
Year of birth missing (living people)